Heaval is the highest hill on the Outer Hebridean island of Barra, Scotland. The highest point is 383 metres high above sea level and it is located 1.5 km northeast of Castlebay.

It is most easily ascended from the south east, from the summit of a 102 m high road pass on the A888 about 1 km east of Castlebay. There is a signposted car park nearby. About halfway up the ridge, there is a white statue of the Virgin and Child. Near the top, the ridge becomes steep, but any difficulties can be bypassed on the south side.

The two other hills on Barra with more than 150 metres of reascent are Ben Tangaval (333 m) in the west, and Ben Cliad (202 m) in the north. Another hill, Theisabhal Mor (190 m) is on Vatersay, which is linked to Barra by a causeway.

Five of the uninhabited islands to the south have summits higher than 150 m. Weather permitting, these islands can be visited, with time for summit ascents, by arrangement with Barra Fishing Charters.

References
Overview of Heaval, Gazetteer for Scotland

External links
 The 'Walk Highlands' guide to ascending Heaval

Barra
Marilyns of Scotland
Mountains and hills of the Outer Hebrides